Oleksiy Babyr; Aleksey Babyr (born 15 March 1990) is a Ukrainian and Russian football forward who plays for Rubin Yalta.

International career
Babyr was a member of Ukraine national under-21 football team, called up by Pavlo Yakovenko for friendly match against Czech Republic national under-21 football team on 17 November 2010.

References

External links 

Profile at Crimean Football Union

Living people
1990 births
Sportspeople from Simferopol
Ukrainian footballers
Ukraine youth international footballers
Ukraine under-21 international footballers
Russian footballers
Ukrainian expatriate footballers
Expatriate footballers in Russia
Expatriate footballers in Belarus
Expatriate footballers in Latvia
Ukrainian Premier League players
Association football forwards
FC Krymteplytsia Molodizhne players
FC Volyn Lutsk players
FC Hoverla Uzhhorod players
FC Tosno players
FC Granit Mikashevichi players
FC Volgar Astrakhan players
FC Neftekhimik Nizhnekamsk players
FC Zvezda Perm players
FC TSK Simferopol players
FC Rubin Yalta players
Crimean Premier League players